The 2007 Philippines Open Grand Prix Gold was a badminton tournament which took place in Metro Manila, Philippines from 17 to 22 July 2007. It had a total purse of $120,000.

Tournament 
The 2007 Philippines Open Grand Prix Gold was the forth tournament of the 2007 BWF Grand Prix Gold and Grand Prix and also part of the Philippines Open championships which has been held since 2006. This tournament was organized by the Philippine Badminton Association and sanctioned by the BWF.

Venue 
This international tournament was held at PhilSports Complex in Metro Manila, Philippines.

Point distribution 
Below is the point distribution for each phase of the tournament based on the BWF points system for the BWF Grand Prix Gold event.

Prize money 
The total prize money for this tournament was US$120,000. Distribution of prize money was in accordance with BWF regulations.

Men's singles

Seeds 

 Cheng Hong (final)
 Lee Chong Wei (champion)
 Bao Chunlai (third round)
 Kenneth Jonassen (quarter-finals)
 Taufik Hidayat (second round)
 Sony Dwi Kuncoro (semi-finals)
 Shōji Satō (third round)
 Muhammad Hafiz Hashim (second round)
 Park Sung-hwan (semi-finals)
 Ronald Susilo (quarter-finals)
 Andrew Smith (third round)
 Kendrick Lee Yen Hui (first round)
 Lee Tsuen Seng (third round)
 Yeoh Kay Bin (second round)
 Chan Yan Kit (first round)
 Ng Wei (third round)

Finals

Top half

Section 1

Section 2

Bottom half

Section 3

Section 4

Women's singles

Seeds 

 Huaiwen Xu (withdrew)
 Pi Hongyan (withdrew)
 Wong Mew Choo (withdrew)
 Eriko Hirose (second round)
 Tine Rasmussen (first round)
 Yip Pui Yin (quarter-finals)
 Kaori Mori (second round)
 Li Li (first round)

Finals

Top half

Section 1

Section 2

Bottom half

Section 3

Section 4

Men's doubles

Seeds 

 Koo Kien Keat / Tan Boon Heong (champions)
 Candra Wijaya /  Tony Gunawan (second round)
 Shintaro Ikeda / Shuichi Sakamoto (first round)
 Albertus Susanto Njoto / Yohan Hadikusumo Wiratama (semi-finals)
 Keita Masuda / Tadashi Ōtsuka (quarter-finals)
 Hendra Aprida Gunawan / Joko Riyadi (first round)
 Ashley Brehaut / Aji Basuki Sindoro (first round)
 Luluk Hadiyanto / Alvent Yulianto (quarter-finals)

Finals

Top half

Section 1

Section 2

Bottom half

Section 3

Section 4

Women's doubles

Seeds 

 Cheng Wen-hsing / Chien Yu-chin (champions)
 Kumiko Ogura / Reiko Shiota (first round)
 Yang Wei / Zhao Tingting (quarter-finals)
 Rani Mundiasti / Endang Nursugianti (quarter-finals)
 Aki Akao / Tomomi Matsuda (withdrew)
 Miyuki Maeda / Satoko Suetsuna (semi-finals)
 Nicole Grether / Juliane Schenk (first round)
 Duanganong Aroonkesorn / Kunchala Voravichitchaikul (first round)

Finals

Top half

Section 1

Section 2

Bottom half

Section 3

Section 4

Mixed doubles

Seeds 

 Nova Widianto / Liliyana Natsir (champions)
 Flandy Limpele / Vita Marissa (semi-finals)
 Daniel Shirley /  Joanne Quay (first round)
 Ingo Kindervater / Kathrin Piotrowski (first round)
 Han Sang-hoon / Hwang Yu-mi (final)
 Zhang Jun / Zhao Tingting (withdrew)
 Devin Lahardi Fitriawan / Lita Nurlita (quarter-finals)
 Muhammad Rijal / Greysia Polii (second round)

Finals

Top half

Section 1

Section 2

Bottom half

Section 3

Section 4

References

External Links 
Tournament Link

Philippines Open
Philippines Open Grand Prix Gold
Badminton tournaments in the Philippines
Sports in Metro Manila